Zlatko Madunić (14 May 1930 – 14 May 1995) was a Croatian actor. He appeared in more than seventy films from 1956 to 1990.

Filmography

References

External links 

1930 births
1995 deaths
People from Slavonski Brod
Croatian male film actors